Child Trends is a nonprofit, nonpartisan research center based in Bethesda, Maryland that conducts research on children, children's families, child well-being, and factors affecting children's lives.

History

Child Trends was founded in 1979 and in 2014 added the Child Trends Hispanic Institute, now the National Research Center on Hispanic Children & Families, with partnership from Duke University, University of North Carolina, and University of Maryland. The organization developed a tool for estimating agencies' kinship diversion practices. 

In 2019, Fortune named the organization as #5 on its list of 25 Best Small and Medium Workplaces for Women.

Funding
The organization is funded through grants and contracts from foundations, federal and state agencies, and other organizations. In 2019, they had revenues of $23 million.

Research
Child Trends studies children and teens at all stages of development and provides research, data, and analysis to advocacy groups, government agencies, and other institutions including program providers, the policy community, researchers and educators, and the media. Research focus includes:

Child Health
Child Poverty
Child Welfare
Children of Immigrants
Early Childhood Development
Education
Foster care
Indicators of Child Well-being
Marriage & Family
Fatherhood & Parenting
School Readiness
Teen Pregnancy
Teen Sex 
Youth Development

Other projects
Child Trends designs and conducts evaluations of child development and well-being. The Child Trends DataBank is an online resource for national trends and research on key indicators of child and youth well-being. Child Trends' What Works  is a collection of experimental evaluations of social interventions that assess child outcomes.

Notable staff and board
Maura Corrigan
Robert Doar
Jennifer Manlove
Mavis Sanders
Deborah Temkin

References

External links
Child Trends
Child Trends DataBank

Research institutes in Washington, D.C.
Think tanks based in Washington, D.C.
1979 in Washington, D.C.
1979 establishments in the United States